Cornuterus is a genus of moths of the family Thyrididae.

Species
Some species of this genus are:
Cornuterus nigropunctula  Pagenstecher 1892
Cornuterus palairanta  Bethune-Baker 1911
Cornuterus paratrivius  Whalley 1971
Cornuterus trivius (Whalley, 1967)

References

Encyclopedia of Life

Thyrididae
Moth genera